"Punarnava" (lit. The Ever Renewing) is a popular award-winning poem by the noted Indian English poet and literary critic Rajlukshmee Debee Bhattacharya. The poem won First Prize in the Third All India Poetry Competition conducted by The Poetry Society (India) in 1991. The poem has been widely cited and anthologised in reputed journals and scholarly volumes on contemporary Indian poetry.

Structure of the poem
The poem has a unique and original structure, which marks a departure from contemporary Indian poetry. Its five lines can be regarded as five stanzas or five paragraphs. The diction is that of prose, but the strong evocative imagery belongs to poetry of the highest quality. The five stanzas evoke images pertaining to five different sense organs - sight, smell, touch, hearing and smell. The poem can be thought of a bouquet of meditations on different paths to Truth.

Excerpts from the poem

"Punonnoba"-Punarnava?
In some rainy month, did you decide
to climb up our lichened wall, to reach
the rusty tin-roof, transforming
its shabbiness into velvet-green,
to hang your emerald-pendants
around the neck of our home?

 *****

All knew the perennial Madhavilata;
the fragrant Hasnuhana; queen of the night.
They gaped when they saw you
running wild on our roof –
Velvet-green, strange, unknown.
We shouted with glee, "It is Punonnoba … Punarnava."
That you had medicinal properties
that your juice soothes and heals
we never knew till the Vaid
sent his servant,
a demon who expertly climbed our roof
hacked away at its emerald-fringed coverlet!
Oh the despair and the hope
the running out in soaking rain
to watch your extending tendrils,
sprouting leaves,
growing in greenness … Punarnava …
eternal companion on the root-top.
That home was left behind,
as birth-strings snapped.

 *****

A refugee, wanderer, I
look for you, but no one here
knows your name. No one knows
a velvet-green medicinal creeper.
Lost to me, Punarnava,
your shade, your cool décor,
your healing magic.

Comments and criticism
The poem has received rave reviews since its first publication in 1995 in the anthology on Indian Poetry Emerging Voices. The poem has been frequently quoted in scholarly analysis of contemporary Indian English Poetry. The poem is regarded by critics as a jewel in contemporary Indian poetry.

Although outwardly the poem describes the leafy growth of a household creeper, it has a hidden message on the re-awakening of woman and regeneration of India's woman power.

Online references
  Third National Poetry Competition 1991 - Award Winners
  Rajlukshmee Debee - A Biography
  India Writes - Contemporary Indian Poetry

See also
Indian English Poetry
The Poetry Society (India)
"Best Indian Poems"

Notes

Indian poems
1991 poems
Works originally published in Indian magazines
Works originally published in literary magazines